Suillus helenae is a species of bolete fungus in the genus Suillus. Found in the United States, it was described as new to science in 1974 by mycologists Harry Delbert Thiers and Alexander H. Smith. The type collection was made in Oregon, where the fungus was found fruiting in dense clusters under Pinus contorta. The spore print is brown; spores are thin-walled, ellipsoid to somewhat cylindrical, with dimensions of 6.5–9.5 by 2.8–4.0 µm.

References

External links

helenae
Fungi of the United States
Fungi described in 1974
Fungi without expected TNC conservation status